The Times Building-Lodge Hall, at 19 E. Waterloo St. in Canal Winchester, Ohio, was built in 1902.  It was listed on the National Register of Historic Places in 1989.

It is a two-part commercial block building.  In 1999, it was still the only three-story building in town.

It was the first building built for the Winchester Times newspaper, and it served the local Masonic and Eastern Star groups for more than 80 years.

The NRHP listing included two contributing buildings. The newspaper and Masonic Lodge partnered to construct the building for joint use. The newspaper had previously been located in three other building before constructing this building, where it remained until 1976. The building also housed the Franklin Telephone company, which brought the first telephone line to town in 1882.

References

Masonic buildings in Ohio
National Register of Historic Places in Franklin County, Ohio

Buildings and structures completed in 1902